Srednja Vas–Goriče is a settlement near Golnik in the Municipality of Kranj in the Upper Carniola region of Slovenia.

Name
The name of the settlement was changed from Srednja vas to Srednja vas - Goriče in 1953. In the past the German name was Srednawas.

References

External links
Srednja Vas–Goriče on Geopedia

Populated places in the City Municipality of Kranj